The fifty thousand rial banknote is a denomination of Iranian currency that was issued in 2007, and was considered its largest denomination until 2010.

The bill features Rouhollah Khomeini's portrait on the front. There are two designs for the back, the original (2007) is nicknamed as the "atomic banknote" by the western media, and the new design (2015) celebrates the eightieth anniversary of the University of Tehran, however is not commemorative.

Design

Original design
Christian Funke describes the design as follows:

Redesign
According to Funke:

References

 

Banknotes of Iran
Currencies introduced in 2007
Fifty-thousand-base-unit banknotes